The Houston Mayoral Election of 2011 took place on November 8, 2011.

The incumbent Mayor Annise Parker ran for a second two-year term in office and was re-elected. There were four other declared candidates: Long time Houstonian Jack O'Connor, a manufacturing businessman. Native Houstonian, Houston Deputy Fire Chief Fernando Herrera, Kevin Simms, a former volunteer intern in Councilman Jarvis Johnson's office and local businessman Dave Wilson.

Results

See also
Politics of Houston
Houston City Council

References

 

Mayoral election, 2011
Houston mayoral
Houston
2011
Non-partisan elections